Black Silent Majority: The Rockefeller Drug Laws and the Politics of Punishment is a non-fiction book written by Michael Javen Fortner.

Overview
A look into the role of how America's drug policies impact African Americans and crime in their own neighborhoods.

Critical reception
The New York Times said in a review of the book, "The history of black people’s ability to express and to act on their punitiveness — to be tough on crime — is at the heart of a fascinating though severely flawed new book by Michael Javen Fortner."

References

African-American literature
Non-fiction crime books
Drug policy of the United States
Law books
2015 non-fiction books
Harvard University Press books